Myosotis arvensis or field forget-me-not is a herbaceous annual to short lived perennial flowering plant in the family Boraginaceae.

Clive Stace describes this plant as having the following characteristics: 
 Mature fruit dark brown, shiny.
 Mature calyx on spreading stalks longer than sepal tube; calyx teeth conceal the ripe fruit.
 Basal leaves stalked, in a rosette; upper leaves not stalked.
 Generally found on open, well drained ground; common throughout the British Isles.

Gallery

References

arvensis
Flora of Michigan
Flora of Europe
Flora without expected TNC conservation status